Dağtekin is a Turkish surname. Notable people with the surname include:

 Ahmet Dağtekin, Turkish politician
 Bora Dağtekin, Turkish-German screenwriter and filmmaker
 Seyhmus Dagtekin, Turkish writer

Turkish-language surnames